Lucas Ariel Campana (born 9 March 1993) is an Argentine professional footballer who plays as a forward for F.C. Motagua.

References
 
 

1993 births
Living people
Argentine footballers
Argentine expatriate footballers
Association football forwards
Footballers from Buenos Aires
Club Atlético Huracán footballers
Deportes La Serena footballers
Deportes Temuco footballers
Club Atlético Brown footballers
Estudiantes de Buenos Aires footballers
San Martín de San Juan footballers
Sport Boys footballers
C.D. Marathón players
F.C. Motagua players
Chilean Primera División players
Primera B de Chile players
Primera Nacional players
Peruvian Primera División players
Liga Nacional de Fútbol Profesional de Honduras players
Argentine expatriate sportspeople in Chile
Argentine expatriate sportspeople in Peru
Argentine expatriate sportspeople in Honduras
Expatriate footballers in Chile
Expatriate footballers in Peru
Expatriate footballers in Honduras